The 1988 Southern Miss Golden Eagles football team was an American football team that represented the University of Southern Mississippi as an independent during the 1988 NCAA Division I-A football season. In their first year under head coach Curley Hallman, the team compiled a 10–2 record and won the 1988 Independence Bowl.

Schedule

References

Southern Miss
Independence Bowl champion seasons
Southern Miss Golden Eagles football seasons
Southern Miss Golden Eagles football